Cyber Monday is a marketing term for  e-commerce transactions on the Monday after  Thanksgiving  in the United States. It was created by retailers to encourage people to shop online. The term was coined by Ellen Davis of the National Retail Federation and Scott Silverman, and made its debut on November 28, 2005, in a Shop.org press release entitled Cyber Monday' Quickly Becoming One of the Biggest Online Shopping Days of the Year". Cyber Monday takes place the Monday after Thanksgiving; the date falls between November 26 and December 2, depending on the year.

Cyber Monday has become the online equivalent to Black Friday and offers a way for smaller retail websites to compete with larger chains. Since its inception, it has become an international marketing term used by online retailers around the world.

According to the Shop.org/Bizrate Research 2005 eHoliday Mood Study, "77 percent of online retailers said that their sales increased substantially on the Monday after Thanksgiving, a trend that is driving serious online discounts and promotions on Cyber Monday this year (2005)".

In 2017, Cyber Monday online sales grew to a record of $6.59 billion, compared with $2.98 billion in 2015, and $2.65 billion in 2014. However, the average order value was $128, down slightly from 2014's $160. The Cyber Monday on November 30, 2020 was the biggest online shopping day in U.S. history with a total of $10.7 billion in online spending.

History
The term "Cyber Monday" was coined by Ellen Davis, and was first used within the ecommerce community during the 2005 holiday season. According to Scott Silverman, the head of Shop.org, the term was coined based on 2004 research showing "one of the biggest online shopping days of the year" was the Monday after Thanksgiving (12th-biggest day historically). Retailers also noted the most significant shopping period was December 5 through 15 of the previous year. In late November 2005, The New York Times reported: "The name Cyber Monday grew out of the observation that millions of otherwise productive working Americans, fresh off a Thanksgiving weekend of window shopping, were returning to high-speed Internet connections at work Monday and buying what they liked."  At the time, a lot of people had slow Internet at home. The idea for having such a holiday was created by Tony Valado, in 2003 while working at 1800Flowers.com, and coined "White Wednesday" to be the day before Thanksgiving for online retailers.

Argentina
According to Argentine press and marked a tenfold growth in users taking advantage of online sales over the previous year.

Australia
Beginning at 7 pm AEDT on November 20 in 2012, Australian online retailers decided to hold a similar event for the first time, dubbed "Click Frenzy". Many websites immediately crashed, went offline, or had major server issues, including the Click Frenzy promotion website. David Jones, a major retailer, ran a competing sale dubbed 'Christmas Frenzy' on the same date.

Belgium
In Belgium, Cyber Monday has gained popularity since 2016. Due to efforts off several major online shops launching large Cyber Monday campaigns, the average revenue during Cyber Monday has increased with 50% compared to the 2015 edition.

Canada
Cyber Monday came to Canada in 2008. The National Post featured an article published on November 25, 2010, stating that the parity of the Canadian dollar with the US dollar caused many Canadian retailers to have Black Friday and Cyber Monday sales of their own. According to the article, an estimated 80% of Canadians were expected to participate in Black Friday and Cyber Monday sales. Speculation has been made that with all major US television broadcasters—which are typically available to Canadians—emphasizing Black Friday and Cyber Monday sales for stores that are also doing business in Canada, Canadian retailers needed to mimic sales offerings in order to keep Canadian dollars from being spent in the US.

By 2011, around 80% of online retailers in Canada were participating in Cyber Monday.

Chile
Chile's first Cyber Monday took place on November 28, 2011. The companies participating in the event are participants in the Santiago Chamber of Commerce's Electronic Commerce Committee.  In 2015 the Chilean Cyber Monday had 85 stores participating, 390.000 transactions and US$83 million in sales.  36% of that was mobile.  In 2016 Cyber Monday will be held on November 7.  140 companies are registered as official partners.

Colombia
The first Cyber Monday in Colombia took place on November 26, 2012. It was organized by the Colombian Chamber of Electronic Commerce and sponsored by the Ministry of IT and Telecommunications.

France
Inspired by the U.S. phenomenon, the term Cyber Monday was first used in France in 2008. France is a country.

Germany
Amazon.de announced that it brought Cyber Monday to Germany in 2010. As of 2014, amazon.de continues to advertise Cyber Monday and has extended it to an 8-day period ("Cyber Monday week") beginning on the Monday before Thanksgiving.

India

India got its own version of the Cyber Monday (Great Online Shopping Festival) on December 12, 2012 when Google India partnered with many e-commerce companies including Flipkart, Snapdeal, HomeShop18, Indiatimes shopping, and MakeMyTrip. Google said that this was the first time an industry-wide initiative of this scale was undertaken. In November 2015, Google announced that the event would not be repeated.

Japan
Amazon.co.jp announced it registered as Cyber Monday with Japan Anniversary Association in 2012. Amazon.co.jp ran the Cyber Monday Seven Day Sale from Dec 10 through December 16, 2012.

Netherlands
In the Netherlands, the term Cyber Monday was first used in 2012. Since then, Dutch online retailers have taken advantage of Cyber Monday in promotional purposes, because it is perfectly timed before the celebration of Sinterklaas which is celebrated by buying gifts for each other in Netherlands. Since 2012, the popularity of Cyber Monday has grown strongly every year in the Netherlands. In total there were 105 participating online stores during the Cyber Monday period of 2017. During Cyber Monday 2019 the total of shops increased with 40 to 189 shops in total

New Zealand
Online retailer Belly Beyond held the first Cyber Monday Sale in New Zealand on November 29, 2010.  The sale lasted for five days, from Monday to Friday.

Portugal
In Portugal, the term Cyber Monday was first used in 2009.

Romania
In Romania, Cyber Monday is the first Monday after Black Friday, which is held by the biggest retailers one week before the US Black Friday.

Sweden
In Sweden Cyber Monday is growing rapidly and several of the largest online retailers regularly launch Cyber Monday campaigns. Cyber Monday was first established on larger online retailers in Sweden 2010.

United Kingdom
According to a 2009 The Guardian article, UK online retailers are now referring to "Cyber Monday" as the busiest internet shopping day of the year that commonly falls on the same day as the US Cyber Monday.

United States
In 2006, comScore reported that online spending on Cyber Monday jumped 25% to $608 million, 21% to $733 million in 2007, and 15% to $846 million in 2008.

In 2009, comScore reported that online spending increased five percent on Cyber Monday to $887 million and that more than half of dollars spent online at US Web sites originated from work computers (52.7 percent), representing a gain of 2.3 percentage points from last year. Buying from home comprised the majority of the remaining share (41.6 percent) while buying from international locations accounted for 5.8 percent.  According to comScore chairman Gian Fulgoni, "comScore data have shown that Cyber Monday online sales have always been driven by considerable buying activity from work locations. That pattern hasn't changed. After returning from the long Thanksgiving weekend with a lot of holiday shopping still ahead of them, many consumers tend to continue their holiday shopping from work.  Whether to take advantage of the extensive Cyber Monday deals offered by retailers or to buy gifts away from the prying eyes of family members, this day has become an annual ritual for America's online holiday shoppers."

In 2010, comScore reported the first-ever $1 billion online shopping day ($1028M), an increase of 16 percent over 2009.  In 2011, comScore reported that Cyber Week saw US consumers spend over $6 billion online from November 28 to December 2. In 2012, comScore reported that Cyber Monday saw a 16% increase in sales from 2011, totaling $1.5 billion. In 2013, Cyber Monday sales continued their growth and recorded their highest grossing day ever at $2.29 billion.

In 2014, the average planned expenditure was $361 per person. 46 percent of people expect to pay with credit cards and 43 percent expect to pay with debit cards. Sales are up 8.1%, according to IBM Digital Analytics. The average order is $131.66, flat with last year, though the number of transactions is up and people are buying more items on average per order.

In 2016, according to Adobe Digital Insights, Cyber Monday hit a new record with $3.45 billion, and which was the first time that online sales in one single day surpassed $3 billion in US history. The numbers went up 12.1% from the previous year.

In 2018, according to Adobe Analytics Cyber Monday hits a record $7.9 billion of online spending which is a 19.3% increase from a year ago.

In 2019, according to Adobe Analytics, Cyber Monday mobile transactions totaled $3.1 billion with total online sales reaching a record $9.4 billion.

U.S. employers have been cracking down on employees using company equipment and company time for non-work-related purposes, including Cyber Monday. As of November 2011, 22% of employers had fired an employee for using the Internet for non-work related activity; 7% of human resource managers surveyed had fired an employee for holiday shopping; and 54% of employers were blocking employees from accessing certain websites. According to CareerBuilder's annual Cyber Monday survey, more than half of workers (53%) say they spend at least some work time holiday shopping on the Internet, up 3% from 2015. Of this group, 43% spend an hour or more doing so, compared to 42% from 2015.

See also
Cyber Black Friday
Green Monday
Black Friday (shopping)
Buy Nothing Day
Small Business Saturday
Super Saturday (Panic Saturday)
Giving Tuesday
Singles' Day

References

E-commerce in the United States
Unofficial observances
2000s neologisms
2004 neologisms
Christmas economics
Monday observances
Observances based on the date of Thanksgiving (United States)
Sales and clearances